Prien may refer to:

Prien am Chiemsee, a municipality in Bavaria, Germany
Prien (river), a river of Bavaria, Germany
Prien, Louisiana, a place in Louisiana, United States
Prien Lake, a lake in Calcasieu Parish, Louisiana
Günther Prien, (1908-1941),  U-Boat captain from World War Two